Chapel Township is an inactive township in Howell County, in the U.S. state of Missouri.

Chapel Township has the name of George Chapell, a pioneer citizen.

References

Townships in Missouri
Townships in Howell County, Missouri